Go Dau Stadium is a multi-use stadium in Thu Dau Mot, Vietnam. It is currently used mostly for football matches and is the home stadium of Becamex Binh Duong F.C. The stadium holds 18,250 people.

Events
 7 May 2011: Super Junior - 3rd Asia Tour: Super Show 3

External links
 StadiumDB page

References

Football venues in Vietnam
Buildings and structures in Bình Dương province
Becamex Binh Duong FC